Borouge is a manufacturer of polyolefins. It is a joint venture of the Abu Dhabi National Oil Company and Borealis of Austria. It was founded in 1998, and has two complementary ventures: Abu Dhabi Polymers Co Ltd (Borouge) - a production company based in Abu Dhabi - and Borouge Pte Ltd based in Singapore. CEO of Abu Dhabi Polymers Co Ltd (Borouge) is Hazeem Sultan Al Suwaidi. CEO of Borouge Pte Ltd is Rainer Hoefling.

The company supplies polyolefin plastics (polyethylene and polypropylene). They focus on differentiated high end applications in the Middle East and Asia Pacific with Borstar Enhanced Polyethylene produced in Abu Dhabi, UAE and the Borealis range of speciality products.

References

External links
 Official site

Petrochemical companies
Plastics companies of the United Arab Emirates
Plastics companies of Singapore
Chemical companies of Singapore
1998 establishments in the United Arab Emirates
Manufacturing companies based in Abu Dhabi